Sharjah Indian School is a senior secondary school for approximately 14,000 students and 600 teachers which is owned and managed by Indian Association Sharjah, located in the United Arab Emirates.

History
Sharjah Indian School was established in 1979 in Sharjah with 280 pupils and 13 teachers. The school currently stands as a landmark in the annals of Indo-UAE ties.

Academics
The school is approved and licensed by the Private Education Department of the UAE Ministry of Education and is affiliated to Central Board of Secondary Education, New Delhi, India. The curriculum and programme of work is in accordance with the requirements of the Central Board of Secondary Education New Delhi, India.

The medium of Instruction in the school is English, with Hindi as the compulsory second language. Arabic is taught as per the rules laid down by the UAE Ministry of Education.

References

External links
 
 Juwaiza website
 Indian Association Sharjah website 

Indian international schools in the United Arab Emirates
International schools in Sharjah (city)
Educational institutions established in 1979
1979 establishments in the United Arab Emirates